is a professional Japanese baseball player. He plays infielder for the Chunichi Dragons.

Ishikawa won the 2019 Japanese High School Baseball Invitational Tournament with Toho High School where he was the team's ace and batted 4th in the line-up. 
In the 2019 NPB Draft, he was largely regarded as the most talented hitter of his class.

Early career
Ishikawa reached national attention after helping Toho High School to victory in the 2019 spring invitational tournament where he was the team's ace and clean-up hitter.

On 16 October 2019, Ishikawa was the contested 1st draft pick for the Chunichi Dragons, Orix Buffaloes, and Fukuoka SoftBank Hawks at the 2019 NPB Draft. Rights to negotiate for Ishikawa's contract were won by the Dragons after manager Tsuyoshi Yoda pulled out the winning ticket.

On 1 November, Ishikawa signed a pre-contract with the Dragons guaranteeing a ¥100,000,000 sign-on bonus and a ¥15,000,000 yearly salary with ¥50,000,000 in incentives.

External links
Japan Baseball.com

References

2001 births
Living people
Baseball people from Aichi Prefecture
People from Handa, Aichi
Japanese baseball players
Nippon Professional Baseball infielders
Chunichi Dragons players